Đorđe Bogić (Serbian Cyrillic: Ђорђе Богић; 6 February 1911 – 17 June 1941) was a protopresbyter in the Serbian Orthodox Church and the parish priest of the Orthodox church in Našice.

He was canonized by the Serbian Orthodox Church as Saint Hieromartyr Georgije Bogić due to his brutal murder by Croatian fascists in 1941.

Life
Đorđe was born in Pakrac on 6 February 1911. He completed grammar school in Nova Gradiška and seminary in Sarajevo. On 25 May 1934, Đorđe was ordained a priest in Pakrac. Đorđe then performed his duties in the parishes of Majar and Bolmače, after which he was moved to Našice, where he happened to be at the beginning of World War II.

Torture and death
His afflictions were witnessed by Proko Prejnović, a Serb who hid from the Ustashe in a tree:

 The Ustashas tied the priest to a tree before they began their atrocities. They cut offthe priest's ears, his nose, and then his tongue. With relish and entirely senselessly, they pulled out his beard and the underlying skin. The poor, exhausted priest cried out of sheer pain. He was still a young man of thirty, healthy and well built. The whole time the priest was resolute and stood upright so that the Ustashas could give free reign to their crudeness. After gouging out his eyes the priest still did not stir so they cut open his stomach and chest so that Bogić collapsed. One could see his heart beating. One of the Ustashas yelled: "Cursed be your Serb mother whose heart is still beating." After this sentence the Ustashas set the priest on fire and shortened his pain and suffering.

According to another witness, the person guilty of these martyr afflictions was a Roman Catholic priest from Našice, Sidonije Šolc: "He (Fra Šolc) had our parish priest Đorđe Bogić killed in the most monstrous manner. They took him out of his apartment in the middle of the night and butchered him.

Đorđe's body remained in the same place the whole night, until the afternoon of the next day. Around 4 PM, the local Romani were ordered to take the corpse to Brezik Našički and to bury it in the graveyard.

Canonization
At the regular session of the Holy Assembly of Bishops of the Serbian Orthodox Church in 1998, Protopresbyter Đorđe was canonized, and his name was entered in the list of names of the Serbian Church Saints.

See also
 List of Serbian saints

References

1911 births
1941 deaths
People from Pakrac
Serbs of Croatia
Persecution of Serbs
Serbian saints of the Eastern Orthodox Church
20th-century Eastern Orthodox martyrs
20th-century Christian saints
Serbian Orthodox clergy
Serb priests
New Martyrs
Hieromartyrs
People executed by the Independent State of Croatia
Serb people who died in the Holocaust
Serbian civilians killed in World War II